Dilated Peoples is an American hip hop group from Los Angeles, California. Better known in the UK, they reached the Top 40 of the UK Singles Chart with two tracks, "This Way" and "Worst Comes to Worst."

Members include DJ Babu (producer/DJ), Evidence (MC/producer) and Rakaa (MC). Their songs were featured in the 2003 video games Need for Speed: Underground and NBA Street Vol. 2.

History
Dilated Peoples began when DJ Babu (from the DJ crew Beat Junkies), Evidence, and Rakaa joined together in 1992 and released "Third Degree" (1997) on ABB Records, developing their material in the underground hip hop community. They had previously recorded an album titled Imagery, Battle Hymns & Political Poetry (1995) that was never released, although many fans still have it on bootlegged tapes. The group eventually signed with Capitol Records and released The Platform (2000).

The second album, Expansion Team, was released in 2001 led by the Alchemist–produced "Worst Comes to Worst," which utilized a vocal sample from Mobb Deep's "Survival of the Fittest" and a musical sample from William Bell's "I Forgot to be Your Lover". Expansion Team debuted at number 8 on the US Billboard R&B Albums chart and number 36 on the Billboard 200. The group's third album, Neighborhood Watch, was released in 2004 and debuted at number 55 on the Billboard 200, selling 143,000 copies in the United States. In addition to the Kanye West produced single, "This Way," it featured the singles "Who's Who?" and "Sorry? OK", which were also included as tracks on the Need for Speed: Underground and SSX 3 soundtracks, and peaked at number 35 on the UK Singles Chart. The fourth album, 20/20, was released in 2006; the debut single, "Back Again", was featured on the Fight Night Round 3 soundtrack. This is the third EA Games soundtrack on which the group has been featured. "Back Again" is also featured on Sony's MLB 06: The Show. In 2012, they collaborated with PlatinumGames to record the track "This is Madness" for the credits of the beat-'em-up video game, Anarchy Reigns. 20/20 was the group's "farewell" album on Capitol Records, ending a four album recording contract. They also work with the underground hip hop group, Global Warning, who originated in Anaheim.

Dilated Peoples are affiliated with fellow West Coast hip hop group tha Alkaholiks. The Liks appeared on The Platform on the track "Right On" and Expansion Team on "Heavy Rotation." The group also collaborated frequently with west coast emcees Defari and Amad Jamal (an Urban Umpires member) and helped to launch their careers.  Defari made one appearance on each Dilated Peoples' album: "Ear Drums Pop (Remix)" on The Platform; "Defari Interlude" on Expansion Team; "Closed Session" on Neighborhood Watch; and "Olde English" on 20/20.  Dilated Peoples also made multiple appearances on Defari's album Odds & Evens.  Another Dilated associate is their long-time producer, the Alchemist, who produced five songs on The Platform, three songs on Expansion Team, four songs on Neighborhood Watch, and two songs on 20/20.  Dilated Peoples were featured on a song on the Alchemists' 1st Infantry album. Rakaa has also made guest appearances on the songs "Trance Fat" on Looptroop's album, Good Things, "Zet 't Blauw" from Dutch rapper Jerome XL's album, De laatste dag and "Memory Fades" on St. Cule's album, American Beef.

Discography

Studio albums

DVDs

Singles

Guest appearances

References

External links

Dilated Peoples Homepage
Evidence Interview
Evidence Interview - "Reunion of Dilated Peoples? 2010!"
BouriBlog | Evidence Interview
BouriBlog | Rakaa Iriscience Interview
Dilated Peoples Video Interview

Hip hop groups from California
Capitol Records artists
Musical groups from Los Angeles
Underground hip hop groups
Rhymesayers Entertainment artists